The following highways are numbered 114:

Canada
 New Brunswick Route 114
 Prince Edward Island Route 114

Costa Rica
 National Route 114

Germany 
 Bundesautobahn 114 (A114)

India
 National Highway 114 (India)

Japan
 Route 114 (Japan)

Philippines
 N114 highway (Philippines)

United States
 Alabama State Route 114
 Arkansas Highway 114
 California State Route 114
 Colorado State Highway 114
 Connecticut Route 114
 Florida State Road 114
 Georgia State Route 114
 Illinois Route 114
 Indiana State Road 114
 Iowa Highway 114 (1924–1968) (former)
 K-114 (Kansas highway)
 Kentucky Route 114
 Louisiana Highway 114
 Maine State Route 114
 Maryland Route 114 (former)
 Massachusetts Route 114
 Massachusetts Route 114A
 M-114 (Michigan highway)
 Minnesota State Highway 114
 Missouri Route 114
 New Hampshire Route 114
 New Hampshire Route 114A
 County Route 114 (Bergen County, New Jersey)
 New Mexico State Road 114
 New York State Route 114
 County Route 114 (Dutchess County, New York)
 County Route 114 (Fulton County, New York)
 County Route 114 (Niagara County, New York)
 County Route 114 (Onondaga County, New York)
 County Route 114 (Steuben County, New York)
 County Route 114 (Sullivan County, New York)
 County Route 114 (Tompkins County, New York)
 North Carolina Highway 114
 Ohio State Route 114
 Oklahoma State Highway 114 (former)
 Pennsylvania Route 114
 Rhode Island Route 114
 Rhode Island Route 114A
 South Carolina Highway 114
 Tennessee State Route 114
 Texas State Highway 114
 Texas State Highway Loop 114 (former)
 Texas State Highway Spur 114
 Texas State Highway Spur 114 (1940–1950) (former)
 Farm to Market Road 114
 Utah State Route 114
 Vermont Route 114
 Virginia State Route 114
 Virginia State Route 114 (1923-1928) (former)
 Virginia State Route 114 (1928-1933) (former)
 West Virginia Route 114
 Wisconsin Highway 114
 Wyoming Highway 114

Territories
 Puerto Rico Highway 114

See also
A114
D114 road
P114
R114 road (Ireland)
R114 (South Africa)
S114 (Amsterdam)